The Rundel Memorial Building is a historic library building located at Rochester in Monroe County, New York. It is the original downtown site of the Rochester Public Library, and along with the Bausch & Lomb Library Building directly across the street, serves as the Central Library of Rochester and Monroe County. It is framed in reinforced concrete and faced in smooth Indiana limestone. It consists of three main floors, a mezzanine, two underground levels, a catwalk level above the river, and a penthouse area for equipment. It was constructed between 1934 and 1936, and represents an integration of Beaux-Arts planning and massing with Art Deco detailing and stylization.  The building is sited along the east side of the Genesee River directly above the Johnson and Seymour millrace and Rochester Subway.  The building was built in part with monies from the estate of Morton W. Rundel and with a grant from the Public Works Administration.

It is a work of prominent Rochester architectural firm Gordon & Kaelber

It was listed on the National Register of Historic Places in 1985.

See also
National Register of Historic Places listings in Rochester, New York

References

External links

Library buildings completed in 1932
Educational buildings in Rochester, New York
Libraries on the National Register of Historic Places in New York (state)
Beaux-Arts architecture in New York (state)
Art Deco architecture in Rochester, New York
National Register of Historic Places in Rochester, New York